Josiah Edmund Roberts (1871 – after 1892) was an English footballer who played in the Football League for Small Heath. Roberts was born in West Smethwick, which was then in Staffordshire He joined Small Heath from Birmingham St George's when the latter club folded in 1892. A right back, he played only one competitive game for the club, on 5 November 1892 in a 4–1 win away at Bootle, which was the game after regular left back Fred Speller broke his leg. Roberts returned to non-league football in 1893.

References

1871 births
Year of death missing
Sportspeople from Smethwick
English footballers
Association football fullbacks
Birmingham St George's F.C. players
Birmingham City F.C. players
English Football League players
Date of birth missing
Place of death missing
Walsall Wood F.C. players